The Citigroup Tower is a 180 m, 42 storey high skyscraper in the Pudong financial district of Shanghai, China, completed in 2005. It is the headquarters building of the Citibank (China) Company Limited.

This is on the list as the 7th largest video-capable screens in the world.

References

External links
http://www.fjjmqz.com/shenzhen/co/548048.htm
Building data on Emporis

Buildings and structures completed in 2005
Citigroup buildings
Skyscraper office buildings in Shanghai